is a passenger railway station located in the city of Ōtsu, Shiga Prefecture, Japan, operated by the West Japan Railway Company (JR West). It is located adjacent to the privately-operated Keihan Electric Railway Keihan Zeze Station, but the two stations are not physically connected and there is no interchange between stations.

Lines

Station layout
The station consists of two island platforms connected by an elevated station building. The station is staffed.

is a railway station in Ōtsu, Shiga, Japan. The station is on the Biwako Line (Tōkaidō Main Line) of West Japan Railway Company (JR West). This article covers both stations.

Platforms

History 
At this time, the stations en route were (from Ōtsu) Ishiba, Baba, Yamashina, Ōtani and Inari. When the last section of the Tōkaidō railway completed on 1 July 1889, the railway from the east connected at Baba, leaving the branch between Baba and Ōtsu. On 1 June 1913, Ōtsu Station and Baba Station were renamed as Hamaōtsu and Ōtsu. On 1 August 1921, the new route between Ōtsu and Kyoto was opened. New Ōtsu Station and Yamashina Station opened en route and the former Ōtsu Station became a freight terminal with no passenger operations and reverted to its former name of Baba. Passenger services were resumed on 15 September 1934 with the station renamed to Zeze. The station came under the control of JR West with the privatization of the Japan National Railway on 1 April 1987.

Station numbering was introduced to the station in March 2018 with Zeze being assigned station number JR-A28.

Passenger statistics
In fiscal 2019, the station was used by an average of 12,915 passengers (boarding passengers only) in 2019, making it the 26th-busiest station by traffic in the West Japan Railway Company's network.

Surrounding area
Japan National Route 1
Keihan Zeze Station
Shiga Prefectural Otsu High School
Shiga Prefectural Otsu Seiryo High School Baba Branch School
Shiga University Faculty of Education Junior High School / Elementary School

See also
List of railway stations in Japan

References

External links

JR West official home page

Railway stations in Japan opened in 1880
Tōkaidō Main Line
Railway stations in Shiga Prefecture
Railway stations in Ōtsu